Jimmy Weldon (born Ivy Laverne Shinn, September 23, 1923) is an American retired voice actor, ventriloquist, and former television host. He is best known as the voice of the Hanna-Barbera cartoon character Yakky Doodle and the host and ventriloquist in the locally produced television series The Webster Webfoot Show. Weldon has a YouTube channel titled Jimmy's Lecture, where he documents stories of his adventures during his time in World War II.

Early life
Born Ivy Laverne Shinn on September 23, 1923 in Dale, Texas, he began his career in 1946 as a disc jockey at KWCO, the radio station which began its operations shortly after he returned home following WWII. He was the first announcer hired at this new radio station.

While there, he developed a character named Webster Webfoot, a little duck who visited him while he was playing record requests from listeners calling in. Often they just wanted to talk to little Webster. They thought Webster was someone other than Weldon, and so he became an important part of Weldon's disc jockey presentations.

Television acting
In 1948, Weldon (and Webster Webfoot) moved to Duncan, Oklahoma, where they performed on another 250-watt AM station, KRHD, for two more years. The big 50,000-watt radio station WFAA in Dallas, Texas, recruited Webster and Weldon as entertainers, and Webster became a real person on television on April 4, 1950, on The Webster Webfoot Show, produced locally by station WFAA-TV.

They moved to California on September 5, 1952, joining KCOP-TV, Channel 13, in Hollywood and continued their television careers. During an appearance at a middle school in Brentwood, Jeff Chandler and Randolph Scott collected the tickets from the children and parents who came to see the show. These two movie stars made Weldon feel very lucky indeed when they commented, "Our children think more of little Webster than they do OUR movie careers." Also, Ralph Edwards was there, and he later gave Webster and Weldon the positions as co-hosts of a new children's game show titled Funny Boners, a junior version of his famous Truth or Consequences radio and television shows, which aired on ABC.

In 1956, Weldon and Webster moved to Fresno, California, which began a career in the San Joaquin Valley at KFRE-TV, Channel 12. This was interrupted, however, when NBC executives called them to New York to replace Shari Lewis on the Hi, Mom show on NBC flagship station, WRCA-TV, Channel 4.

In 1959, Channel 13 in Hollywood once again became their television home.

In 1961, Weldon and Webster were called back to the San Joaquin Valley. They continued performing their show on KJEO-TV, Channel 47, in Fresno, California, throughout the 1960s. During this time, Weldon and Webster also did TV shows in Salinas and Bakersfield, California, flying their airplane from city to city for those shows.

Voice acting and other work
It was thanks to Webster's voice that he earned the voice-over for the Hanna-Barbera cartoon character, Yakky Doodle. Many of the odd animal sounds were also performed by Weldon. He also was the voice of Solomon Grundy on Hanna-Barbera's series Challenge of the Super Friends. Jimmy has also made numerous television appearances in acting on shows such as Dragnet, Alfred Hitchcock Presents, The Waltons, Dallas, and Diff'rent Strokes.

Weldon has also played some supporting characters on the popular radio drama Adventures in Odyssey and in classic serials and TV series. He is currently a member of the Premiere Speakers Bureau.

Filmography

References

External links 
Jimmy Weldon's official Web site

Interview on Stu's Show

1923 births
Living people
American male voice actors
American male television actors
American television personalities
Hanna-Barbera people
Ventriloquists
Male actors from Texas
United States Army Air Forces personnel of World War II